Tero Similä (born 26 February 1980 in Ylivieska, Northern Ostrobothnia) is a Finnish cross-country skier. He competed in cross-country skiing at the 2006 Winter Olympics in Turin, and placed tenth in the relay with the Finnish team.

Doping ban 
Similä tested positive for EPO in an out-of-competition control 9 March 2014. He was handed a two-year ban from sports for the anti-doping rule violation.

Cross-country skiing results
All results are sourced from the International Ski Federation (FIS).

Olympic Games

World Championships

World Cup

Season standings

References

External links

1980 births
Living people
Doping cases in cross-country skiing
Finnish sportspeople in doping cases
People from Ylivieska
Finnish male cross-country skiers
Olympic cross-country skiers of Finland
Cross-country skiers at the 2006 Winter Olympics
Sportspeople from North Ostrobothnia
21st-century Finnish people